Adoxophyes heteroidana is a species of moth of the family Tortricidae. It is found in Australia, where it has been recorded from Queensland.

References

Moths described in 1881
Adoxophyes
Moths of Australia